The Piggy Bank Bandit is a serial bank robber, who is responsible for at least 6 bank robberies in the Phoenix, Arizona area. The FBI believes the Piggy Bank Bandit is responsible for four bank robberies in December 2020 and two robberies in February 2021. The Piggy Bank Bandit was dubbed by the FBI as one of the robberies ended in the robber taking rolls of coins as the loot.

Robberies
In total, 6 banks have been robbed across 4 jurisdictions.

The FBI believes that the first bank robbery the “Piggy Bank Bandit” did was on a US Bank in Tempe, Arizona on December 1, 2020. The robber got away with a bag full of rolled coins, which is why the FBI nicknamed them the “Piggy Bank Bandit”. That robbery was followed by a robbery on December 17, 2020 at a Desert Financial Credit Union in Mesa, Arizona. The third robbery was on December 18, 2020 at an Arizona Federal Credit Union in Phoenix, Arizona. The fourth robbery was on February 22, 2021 at a US Bank in Gilbert, Arizona. The fifth and sixth robbery took place on February 26, 2021. Both robberies took place at US Banks in Phoenix, Arizona. 

During each of the robberies, the “Piggy Bank Bandit” gave a note to the teller and demanded money.

Investigation
Once the “Piggy Bank Bandit” had crossed jurisdictions between the different bank robberies, the FBI was called in to investigate the bank robberies. During one of the robberies, a security camera caught a glimpse of a tattoo on the “Piggy Bank Bandit’s” neck.   Using that information, the FBI Violent Crimes Task Force sent statements to the public, asking for any information that would lead to the arrest of the robber. The FBI has not caught the robber yet.

See also
Crime in Phoenix
List of fugitives from justice who disappeared

References

American bank robbers
Bank robberies
21st-century American criminals
American male criminals
Unidentified American criminals
Year of birth missing (living people)